Fancy Chamber Music is an album by the American composer, bandleader and keyboardist Carla Bley, recorded in England in 1997 and released on the Watt/ECM label in 1998.

Reception
The AllMusic review by Tim Sheridan stated: "Always the iconoclast, here pianist Bley applies her keen musical skill on baroque and chamber styles with tongue firmly in cheek and a fine string section to set the mood". The Penguin Guide to Jazz stated: "Very little to separate the fancy from the funky. Vintage Bley".

Track listing
All compositions by Carla Bley.
 "Wolfgang Tango" - 14:29  
 "Romantic Notion No. 4" - 2:26  
 "End of Vienna" - 9:00  
 "Tigers in Training" - 19:02  
 "Romantic Notion No. 6" - 1:05  
 "Jon Benet" - 7:17
Recorded at SnakeRanch Studio, London, England on December 5 & 6, 1997.

Personnel
Carla Bley - piano
Steve Morris - violin  
Andrew Byrt - viola  
Emma Black - cello  
Steve Swallow - double bass  
Alison Hayhurst - flute  
Sara Lee - clarinet, glockenspiel  
Chris Wells - percussion

References

ECM Records albums
Carla Bley albums
1998 albums